The 27th Grey Cup was played on December 9, 1939, before 11,738 fans at Lansdowne Park at Ottawa.

The Winnipeg Blue Bombers defeated the Ottawa Rough Riders 8–7. The weekend of the match saw very low temperatures so the night before the game the groundskeepers attempted to warm the playing surface by lighting hundreds of litres of gasoline, nevertheless, the field was frozen again the next day.

External links

References 

Grey Cup
Grey Cup
Grey Cups hosted in Ottawa
1939 in Ontario
December 1939 sports events
1930s in Ottawa
Ottawa Rough Riders
Winnipeg Blue Bombers